North Carolina Highway 711 (NC 711) is a primary state highway in the U.S. state of North Carolina. It connects the town of Pembroke with Interstate 95 (I-95) and U.S. Route 301 (US 301) in Lumberton. The highway travels in an east-to-west orientation but is signed as a north-south highway (with its easternmost point in Lumberton as its southern terminus), entirely in Robeson County.

Route description

NC 711 is a predominantly two-lane highway that travels from I-95/US 301 in Lumberton to NC 710 in Pembroke. South of the I-95 interchange, the road continues to the east towards downtown Lumberton as NC 72. Two key features of the route is its crossing of the Lumber River near its southern terminus and its pass-by of University of North Carolina at Pembroke in downtown Pembroke.

History
NC 711 was established in 1951 or 1952 as a reestablishment of a primary highway between Lumberton and Pembroke. The route previously existed as US 74, but was downgraded to a secondary road when it was rerouted south onto new bypass south of the Lumber River in 1949.  The original routing was from NC 72 to NC 710. Between 1963-1968, NC 711 was extended south, overlapping NC 72 to its current southern terminus with I-95/US 301.

Junction list

References

External links

NCRoads.com: N.C. 711

711
Transportation in Robeson County, North Carolina